Myadestinae (the turdid solitaires) are a subfamily of passerine birds in the family Turdidae. Members of this group have been noted by ornithologists to be rather unusual in that they lack the typical diagnostic traits seen in the "true" thrushes of the sister subfamily Turdinae. Examples of including the lack syringeal morphology seen in turdines and the feeding ecology of myadestines being similar to those of Old World flycatchers. A 2005 molecular study from Klicka et al. found support in a basal clade consisting of the genera Sialia, Neocossyphus, Stizorhina, and Myadestes to be sister to the rest of the thrushes. The divergence between myadestines and turdines occurred 11 million years ago in the Serravallian.

References

 
Bird subfamilies